Glamsbjerg is a town in central Denmark with a population of 3,344 (1 January 2022), located in Assens municipality on the island of Funen in Region of Southern Denmark.

Glamsbjerg is a comparatively new town in Denmark. It came to be in 1884 when the Odense–Assens railroad was opened. Many of the houses in Glamsbjerg are from 1900.

Before Glamsbjerg was a "town" it was a village in Køng parish.  It appears on the first page of the Køng churchbook (parish register) in 1687 at the baptism of Jeppe, son of Simon Ibsen of Glamsberg.  The spelling "Glamsbjerg" first appears in 1694.  In the 1801 census, the population of Glamsbjerg was 158 persons in 32 households.

Notable people 
 Karl Skytte (1908 in Glamsbjerg – 1986) a Danish politician and member of Folketinget 1947-1978 
 Johan Absalonsen  (born 1985 in Flemløse near Glamsbjerg) a footballer, almost 400 club caps and 2 for Denmark

External links
Assens municipality

References

Cities and towns in the Region of Southern Denmark
Populated places in Funen
Assens Municipality